René Lavocat (August 24, 1909August 9, 2007) was a French paleontologist who described several genera of African dinosaurs including the sauropod Rebbachisaurus, as well as several extinct mammals such as the family Kenyamyidae. The mammal Lavocatia, the notosuchian Lavocatchampsa, the sauropod Lavocatisaurus and the phorusrhacid Lavocatavis are named after him.

Paleontological discoveries
Eager to try paleontological research in Africa to find Oligocene mammals, Lavocat was strongly endorsed by Camille Arambourg. In 1947, he obtained leadership of a research mission in the Algerian-Moroccan desert.

He did not find any Oligocene mammals, but instead came across a rich fauna of Cretaceous vertebrates. His first notes on this subject were made in 1948 entitled les Comptes Rendus Sommaires de la Société géologique de France (English: Report Summary to the Geological Society of France) in which Lavocat explains the discovery of a large number of Cretaceous reptiles (dinosaurs and crocodiles) and fish in the bedrock of the desert. A year later, a second note appeared in the same journal and extends his discoveries to the southwestern Kem Kem.

In 1954, Lavocat described a new species of sauropod, Rebbachisaurus, discovered in the region. In addition, in 1955 he described a new genus of theropod, Majungasaurus. In 1960, Lavocat returned to Africa and described a second species of Rebbachisaurus, R. tamesnensis. In 1973, Lavocat discovered two genera and three species of Miocene rodent, which he placed in the family Kenyamyidae.

References

French paleontologists
1909 births
2007 deaths